James Seymour Spaight (1936-2011) was a British sports shooter.

Shooting career
Spaight represented England and won a bronze medal in the fullbore rifle Queens Prize, at the 1974 British Commonwealth Games in Christchurch, New Zealand. Four years later he represented England and won a silver medal in the fullbore rifle Queens Prize, at the 1978 Commonwealth Games in Edmonton, Alberta, Canada.

He won over 20 individual major Bisley trophies.

References

1936 births
2011 deaths
British male sport shooters
Shooters at the 1974 British Commonwealth Games
Shooters at the 1978 Commonwealth Games
Commonwealth Games medallists in shooting
Commonwealth Games silver medallists for England
Commonwealth Games bronze medallists for England
Medallists at the 1974 British Commonwealth Games
Medallists at the 1978 Commonwealth Games